Century City is a 250 ha suburb of Cape Town, South Africa. Century City is structured as a mixed-use development including entertainment, residential, retail and office components. It is located 10 km to the north-east of central Cape Town along the N1 motorway and is traversed by numerous waterways, wetlands and canals.

Development 

Development began under Monex Development in 1997 and continues under the new owners, Rabie Property Group. Century City's original developments were the Ratanga Junction theme park and Canal Walk shopping centre. When it was opened in December 2000, Canal Walk was the largest shopping mall in Africa and the Southern Hemisphere in lettable area at 125,000 m².

The Ratanga Junction theme park closed in May 2018 after many years of financial problems. The site will be redeveloped for residential use.

Conservation
Built on a wetland area, Century City needed to comply with conservation measures. Intaka Island is a 16-hectare wetland area within the development. The wetland naturally cleans the water in the canals and provides a green lung in an otherwise high-density development.

Criticism
There were concerns that Century City would cause decentralisation from the Cape Town central business district, but thanks to the city improvement district (CID) and urban renewal efforts spearheaded by the Cape Town Partnership (CTP), this has not happened. This development thus remains another commercial node in the Cape Town metropolitan area while the city centre remains vibrant. More recently, the development has been criticized for causing traffic problems. Measures have been taken with an aim to improve congestion during peak hours.

References

 

Suburbs of Cape Town